Hydrophyllum is a genus of herbaceous perennial plants in the waterleaf family. It consists of nine species, all of which are native to North America.

All Hydrophyllum are found in areas of mesic or moist soil.

Species
 Hydrophyllum appendiculatum Michx. -- Great waterleaf
 Hydrophyllum brownei Kral & Bates -- Browne's waterleaf
 Hydrophyllum canadense L. -- Blunt-leaf waterleaf, bluntleaf waterleaf
 Hydrophyllum capitatum Dougl. ex Benth. -- Ballhead waterleaf
 Hydrophyllum fendleri (Gray) Heller -- Fendler's waterleaf
 Hydrophyllum macrophyllum Nutt. -- Largeleaf waterleaf
 Hydrophyllum occidentale (S. Wats.) Gray -- Western waterleaf
 Hydrophyllum tenuipes Heller -- Pacific waterleaf
 Hydrophyllum virginianum L. -- Virginia waterleaf, Shawnee salad

External links
 Jepson Manual Treatment

 
Boraginaceae genera